A Gemeindestraße is a local road in Germany that is the responsibility of the municipality or parish (Gemeinde) or of the town (kreisfreie Stadt) to build and/or maintain. In the official ranking of roads by importance a Gemeindestraße falls below a Kreisstraße and, unlike the latter, it is not numbered.

Because these roads have to be funded by the local community, the parishes occasionally try to have Gemeindestraßen reclassified as Kreisstraßen that then have to be maintained by the district or Kreis. This is also important for those living there e.g. because then the permission for enclosing the road is decided elsewhere and the occupants' contributions may be calculated differently.

See also 
 Autobahn
 Bundesstraße
 Landesstraße
 Kreisstraße

External links 
 Parish regulations of the German states 

Roads in Germany
Municipal roads